= Ward (Vietnam) =

Type of second-level administrative unit in Vietnam

Ward (Vietnamese: phường) is a type of second tier subdivision of Vietnam. As of 1 July 2025, Vietnam has a total of 687 wards.

According to hierarchy of Vietnamese administrative unit, wards are subordinate to provinces and centrally-governed city as the second tier unit.

Currently, to manage the urban areas and their associating families, each ward is divided into neighborhoods (Vietnamese: khu phố; transl. "quarter"), with each neighborhood the most basic organization of population.
